Queen Wonhwa of the Gyeongju Choe clan was a Goryeo princess as the younger daughter and child of King Seongjong, from Lady Yeonchang who became a queen consort through her marriage with her half first cousin once removed, King Hyeonjong as his 2nd wife. From this marriage, Queen Wonhwa became the eighth reigned Goryeo queen who followed her maternal clan after Queen Wonjeong, her half-sister.

Upon her marriage, she was honoured as Princess Consort Hangchun (항춘전왕비, 恒春殿王妃) and later changed into Princess Consort Sangchun (상춘전왕비, 常春殿王妃) followed her residence after married which was "Hangchun Hall" (항춘전, 恒春殿) before the name changed to "Sangchun Hall" (상춘전, 常春殿). Beside that, she was also known as Queen Daemyeong (대명왕후, 大明王后) while lived in the "Daemyeong Palace" (대명궁, 大明宮). She also bore Hyeonjong a son and two daughters. In 1010, when the Khitans invaded, She and Hyeonjong went to Naju, Jeollanam-do and after retreated, they returned to Gaegyeong.

In 1017 (8th year reign of King Hyeonjong), her maternal families was given royal titles and ranks, such as her maternal grandfather, Choe Haeng-eon (최행언) was granted a royal position, Sangseojwabokya (상서좌복야, 尙書右僕射); her maternal grandmother, Lady Gim was given a royal title, "Grand Lady of the Pungsan County" (풍산군대부인, 豊山郡大夫人); while her mother, Lady Yeonchang was honoured as "Grand Lady of the Nakrang County" (낙랑군대부인, 樂浪郡大夫人). Although her death date is unknown, but she later received her Posthumous name of Won-hwa (원화, 元和).

References

External links 
Queen Wonhwa on Encykorea .
원화왕후 on Doosan Encyclopedia .

Year of birth unknown
Year of death unknown
Consorts of Hyeonjong of Goryeo
Korean queens consort
Goryeo princesses